William Dobson was an English Baroque painter of the 17th century.

William Dobson may also refer to:

William Dobson (academic) (1650–1731), English academic, President of Trinity College, Oxford
William Dobson (banker), English banker, apothecary, and Lord Mayor of York
William Polk Dobson (1793–1846), American politician, state senator for Surry County, North Carolina
William Charles Thomas Dobson (1817–1898), English painter
William Dobson (antiquary) (1820–1884), English journalist and antiquary
William Lambert Dobson (1833–1898), Australian judge and politician
William J. Dobson (born 1973), American journalist

See also
SS William A. Dobson, liberty ships (1944)